Carpenter is a surname. Its use as a forename or middle name is rare. Within the United States, it is ranked as the 231st-most common surname as of the 2010 Census. The English meaning of carpenter is from the occupation of one who makes wooden objects and structures by shaping wood.

Origin
Common use of the Carpenter surname in the English language is seen circa 1275–1325 in Middle English. Its use prior to this time as a surname has roots in the Anglo-Norman French introduced into England about the time of the Norman conquest of England of 1066. The earliest attested use as a surname in English is from 1121, though its use as a secondary name or description in the Domesday Book of 1086 might have precedence.

In Old French, the surname was commonly written as "Carpentier" and its earlier form as "Charpentier". Its use as a surname may have derived as a nickname or description of one's occupation circa 900–1000.

All of these variations come from the Late Latin carpentārĭus, denoting use as an artifex – a wagon or carriage-maker equal to a wainwright. The roots of carpentārĭus come from the Latin carpentum, meaning a two-wheeled carriage or a form of chariot not used directly for warfare in the community by women and others, plus arius – used in the masculine form as a noun denoting an agent of use from other nouns. It may be related to the Old Irish carpat and the Gaulish carbad for carriage or cart, and is probably related to the Gaulish karros.

Carpenter name variants
Variants include:
 Wright – Woodwright, from "wood wright" (wood worker).  Compare with Wainwright (name), from "wain wright" (a wooden wagon maker).
 Carpentier and Charpentier – from the French Norman Carpentier (le Carpentier, le Charpentier), a worker of wood, derived from the late Latin "carpentarius", a maker of wooden carriages.  The surname Charpentier could be the source of other surnames due to the adventurousness of some early French bearers; for example, Francois Charpentier and Joseph Charpentier were Jacobites captured during the 1745 rising while in the French Service. Francois was a native of Dieppe, France captured at Carlisle, Marshalsea, and Joseph was captured at sea and imprisoned at Berwick.
 Carpender – an English phonetic name variant, also seen as Carpendar.

In other languages

 Mac an tSaoir – Irish for "son of the descendants of the workman", anglicized as MacIntyre or Macintyre, Carpenter (particularly in and around Dublin), and other related names, sometimes incorrectly as Freeman.  Carpenter is not an Irish name in origin, but may have been adopted as a result of a 1465 law enacting that "every Irishman that dwells betwixt or amongst Englishmen in the County of Dublin, Myeth, Vriell, and Kildare ... shall take to him an English Surname of ... arte or science, as ... carpenter"; the surname was recorded there as early as 1636 and as late as 1890.  In County Kerry, the surname is said to be that of an English family who settled on estates near Tralee as a result of the Irish Rebellion of 1641.  After the Restoration in 1660, John Carpenter, Philip Carpenter, Capt. Phillip Carpenter, and Lt. Thomas Carpenter were among the "Forty-Nine (i.e, 1649) Officers" who supported the Royalist cause in the Irish Confederate Wars rewarded with grants of land in Ireland.  The 1659 census of County Limerick listed Carpenter as a family surname in Balliea townland, Small County Barony, and among the tituladoes (principal residents) in the barony of Cosmay in Limerick.  In 1890, 10 entries for Carpenter were made in Ireland's birth indexes, with 8 in Leinster Province (County Dublin), and 1 each in Munster and Ulster provinces.  Many of the MacIntyres of Northern Ireland are believed to be descended from the Scottish Clan MacIntyre whose ancient seat was in Lorne.  A documented instance of the surname Carpenter being adopted by an Irish McIntyre in America is that of Ireland-born brothers Owen Patrick McIntyre of Placer County, California and Michael Carpenter of Ottawa County, Michigan as shown in McIntyre's last will & testament dated August 25, 1875 and filed September 11, 1875 naming his brother Michael to direct the education of his nephew and namesake Michael's son Owen Patrick Carpenter.
 Ács – carpenter in Hungarian.
Agaççy – carpenter in Turkish.
 Carpentiere – carpenter in Italian, a worker of wood, from the Latin "carpentarius".
 Carpintero and Carpenteiro – carpenter in Spanish.  A worker in wood, from the Latin "carpentarius".
 Chippie – British and Australian slang for a carpenter. Can be used for either the occupation or surname.
 Dailidė – carpenter in Lithuanian.
 De Carpenter or De Carpentier – Dutch for "the carpenter", a worker of wood, from the French Carpentier.
 Plotnikov – carpenter in Russian.
 Puusepp – carpenter in Estonian.
 Cieśla and Cymerman – carpenter in Polish.
 Tâmplaru – carpenter in Romanian.
 Tesař and Teslyar – carpenter in Czech.
 Timmerman – carpenter in Dutch, a worker of wood.
 Tischler and Schreiner, which are also surnames, are German names for woodworking names/professions related to the English word Carpenter.
 Tømmermann – carpenter in Norwegian.
 Zimmermann – German for a worker in wood. Also the variant Simmerman.

See also
 List of people with surname Carpenter, for real and fictional Carpenters
 Carpenter (disambiguation), for Carpenter named communities, natural features, and man-made features
 Historic Carpenter Houses, for houses, homes, shops, homesteads, farmsteads, or other partially named or hyphenated named places with "Carpenter" or a similar meaning name

References

English-language surnames
Occupational surnames
English-language occupational surnames